Dollar Glen is a small glen (valley) owned by the National Trust for Scotland. It is located in the Ochils that dramatically mark the Highland fault. It is near the town of Dollar, Scotland in the county of Clackmannanshire. It is popular with walkers and visitors, featuring on many routes in the area.

Features
The glen has many plants, a stream and several small waterfalls.

References

National Trust for Scotland properties
Tourist attractions in Clackmannanshire